Harry Douglas IV (born September 16, 1984) is a former American football wide receiver who played in the National Football League (NFL) for ten seasons. He played college football at Louisville. 

Douglas was drafted by the Atlanta Falcons in the third round of the 2008 NFL Draft. He played for the Falcons for seven seasons before playing another three seasons with the Tennessee Titans. He now works as an NFL analyst for ESPN and host on ESPN Radio.

Early years
Douglas attended Jonesboro High School. Douglas was a basketball star in high school, averaging 20.5 points, 3 rebounds, 4.5 assists, and 3 steals as a senior. On the gridiron, he was also exceptional, accumulating 80 catches for 1,539 yards and 14 touchdowns over his 3-year career. He was rated 3-stars by Rivals.com and accepted a scholarship to Louisville in 2003, picking the Cardinals over Cincinnati, Pittsburgh, and Missouri.

He is the brother of Toney Douglas, who last played point guard for the Memphis Grizzlies of the National Basketball Association (NBA) and currently plays for Iraklis Thessaloniki of the Greek Basket League. Harry and Toney are the sixth pair of brothers to play in the NFL and NBA, respectively.

College career
Douglas saw no action in 2003, red shirting, and spending the entire year on the scout team.

In his first year of action, Douglas played in 12 games as a wideout and caught 5 passes for 43 yards. He played a valuable role on special teams as well. His highlight of the year was a 65-yard touchdown run on a reverse in the 2004 AutoZone Liberty Bowl in Memphis that propelled the Cardinals to a 44–40 victory and a #6 final AP ranking in the team's last year as a member of Conference USA.

Douglas saw an increased role in 2005 with the departure of J.R. Russell. His first career receiving touchdown came in a 3 catch, 91 yard performance against Oregon State in which the Cardinals won, 63–27. Against arch-rival Cincinnati, he had a (then) career-high 5 catches for 87 yards and a touchdown in a 46–22 victory. Douglas finished the year with 27 catches for 457 yards.

As a junior, he would be counted on even more with the graduations of Montrell Jones and Joshua Tinch. He started off the year with a 26-yard run off a reverse against Kentucky that set up a 48-yard score by Michael Bush in a 59–28 win. Against Miami, despite scoring no touchdowns, he had a big game catching 4 passes for 94 yards on his birthday. He caught a touchdown pass from Hunter Cantwell the next week at Kansas State in a 24–6 win, and went on to catch 5 more, 2 in the season finale against Connecticut. In the 2007 Orange Bowl, he registered a personal best and an Orange Bowl best 10 catches for 165 yards in a 24–13 Cardinals win. He and teammate Mario Urrutia proved to be one of the best receiving tandems in the entire nation.

Douglas started off 2007 with a bang, catching 5 balls for 151 yards and 2 scores in an easy win over Murray State. He caught a touchdown pass in each of his team's next 3 games against MTSU, Kentucky, and Syracuse before suffering an injury. He returned on October 13 against Cincinnati, catching 7 passes for 118 yards, none of which was more important than a 51-yard reception that set up a game winning touchdown by Anthony Allen in a 28–24 win. To close out the year, he caught a touchdown in a 24–17 win over Pitt and came up with a great performance despite a 55–17 loss at South Florida, recording 8 receptions for 136 yards and 1 touchdown. After the year, he was invited to the Under Armour Senior Bowl in Mobile, AL along with teammate Brian Brohm. He graduated from Louisville with a degree in Political Science.

Statistics
The following table lists Douglas' career statistics.

Awards and honors
2006 1st team All-Big East
2007 1st team All-Big East
2007 2nd Team AP All-American

Professional career

Atlanta Falcons

2008

He was drafted by the Atlanta Falcons in the third round of the 2008 NFL Draft. Douglas scored his first 2 career touchdowns in a Week 12 meeting against the Carolina Panthers. He first found the end zone on a seven-yard end around in the first quarter to give the Falcons a 10–0 lead. Douglas then became the 10th player in Falcons history to return a punt for a touchdown and the first since 2004 when Allen Rossum returned a punt 61 yards in the fourth quarter. Douglas return was the longest in his career, topping the previous mark of 33 yards against New Orleans Saints in Week 10. Along with a 61-yard punt return, Douglas totaled career-highs in offensive touches with six, two rushing, four receiving and all purpose yards 188 which included three rushing, 92 receiving and 93 yards on punt returns, He finished the game with 92 receiving yards, which led the team and fell four yards short of his career-high (96 vs. Chicago, October 12). Douglas was named NFC Special Teams Player of the Week for his performance against the Panthers. Douglas finished his rookie season with 19 returns for 226 yards and a touchdown, he also caught 23 passes for 329 yards and a touchdown.

2009
During the fifth day of the Falcons' training camp, Douglas was taken off the field after injuring his left knee while working in a one-on-one drill. The Falcons confirmed the next day that Douglas will be out for the 2009 season and placed on injured reserve.

2012
During the 2012 season, in week 15, Douglas caught three passes, totaling 83 yards, helping the Falcons defeat the New York Giants 34-0. It was, at the time, the worst shutout loss to a defending Super Bowl champion team in NFL history.

2013
Douglas had a career-year in 2013. He played in all 16 games and racked up 1,067 yards on 85 receptions with 2 touchdowns (all career highs). The apparent cause of this heavy workload was the injury bug the Falcons' receiving corps caught early on in the season. Julio Jones and Roddy White were both plagued with injuries most of the year, with Jones suffering a season ending fractured foot in Week 5. The Falcons finished the season 4-12.

On February 27, 2015 Douglas was released by the Falcons.

Tennessee Titans

2015
On March 10, 2015, Douglas signed a three-year contract with the Tennessee Titans.

2016
On December 11, 2016 during a game against the Denver Broncos, Douglas became the subject of controversy when he dove directly at the knees of Broncos cornerback Chris Harris Jr. Harris immediately went down but later returned to the game. After that play, a brief scuffle ensued between Douglas and Broncos cornerback Aqib Talib. Many current and former players, as well as journalists considered the hit "dirty". He was not fined for the incident. He finished the season with 15 receptions for 210 yards and no touchdowns.

2017
On September 3, 2017, Douglas was placed on injured reserve with a knee injury. He was activated off injured reserve to the active roster on November 25, 2017. He finished the season playing in two games making one reception in a week 12 victory against the Indianapolis Colts for eight yards. He also played in the week 13 victory against the Houston Texans, but recorded no stats.

Career statistics

References

External links
Tennessee Titans bio
Louisville Cardinals bio

1985 births
Living people
People from Jonesboro, Georgia
Sportspeople from the Atlanta metropolitan area
Players of American football from Georgia (U.S. state)
American football wide receivers
Louisville Cardinals football players
Atlanta Falcons players
Tennessee Titans players